This is a list of seasons completed by the Marquette Golden Eagles men's college basketball team.

Seasons

References

 
Marquette Golden Eagles
Marquette Golden Eagles basketball seasons